Jack Heal (23 February 1919 – 8 December 1988) was an Australian rules footballer who played with West Perth in the West Australian Football League (WAFL) and Melbourne in the Victorian Football League (VFL).

Notes

External links 

Jack Heal at Demonwiki

1919 births
Australian rules footballers from Western Australia
Melbourne Football Club players
West Perth Football Club players
1988 deaths